Mang'ola is an administrative ward in the Karatu district of the Arusha Region of Tanzania. It is mainly known for its onion farms and being the onion capital of Tanzanian. According to the 2012 census, the ward had a total population of 6,087.

References

Karatu District
Wards of Arusha Region